Ramdeo Rai (5 January 1943 – 29 August 2020) was an Indian politician. He was elected to the Bihar Legislative Assembly from Bachhwara in 2015. Rai was the most senior politician in the Bihar Congress Party and he served six times as a Member of Bihar Legislative Assembly. In 14 November 1965 he started his career in politics on Jawaharlal Nehru's birthday. In 1984 he won the Samastipur Lok Sabha constituency against Karpoori Thakur.

References

2020 deaths
1943 births
People from Begusarai district
Bihar MLAs 2005–2010
Bihar MLAs 2015–2020
Bihar MLAs 1980–1985
Bihar MLAs 1977–1980
Bihar MLAs 1972–1977
India MPs 1984–1989
Lok Sabha members from Bihar
Indian National Congress politicians from Bihar